Steven Levy (born 1951) is an American journalist.

Steven Levy may also refer to:

 Steve Levy (born 1965), seventh County Executive of Suffolk County, New York
 Stephen Young (actor) (born 1939), Canadian actor who was born Stephen Levy in Toronto
 Steven Levy (politician), American state legislator in Massachusetts
 Steven Levy (Stevie Ocean) Actor and singer in Jersey, Channel Islands